"Smile" is a song recorded by R&B group the Emotions released as a single in 1978 on Columbia Records. The single reached No. 6 on the Billboard Hot Soul Songs chart.

Overview
Smile was produced by Maurice White who also composed the song with Al McKay. The single's b-side was a song called Changes. Both Smile and Changes came from The Emotions 1978 studio album Sunbeam.

Critical reception
Craig Lytle of Allmusic called the song an "aggressively paced number, from the simmering verses to the spellbinding change-up," which "bounces with effervescence." John Storm Roberts of High Fidelity also described Smile as a "tight, unfussy" tune.

References

1978 singles
1978 songs
The Emotions songs
Columbia Records singles
Songs written by Maurice White
Songs written by Al McKay
Song recordings produced by Maurice White